Joey Serlin (born 1970) is a Canadian rock guitarist and songwriter.

He was a member of The Watchmen, a Canadian alternative rock band active in the 1990s. Following that band's breakup, he worked with Canadian Idol winners Ryan Malcolm and Kalan Porter, and formed the band Redline with Watchmen touring drummer Ryan Ahoff and Headstones bassist Tim White, although that band broke up in 2005. He has scored both short and feature films, as well as composing music for major video games.

Serlin is partner, composer and director for Vapor music, an award-winning audio house with offices in Toronto, Vancouver, Chicago, and San Francisco. While at Vapor, Serlin has composed music for international commercials for brands such as Budweiser, Coke, Nintendo, GM, Nissan and Chrysler.

The Watchmen reunited in September 2009 for select shows and are working on new material.

References 

Canadian rock guitarists
Canadian male guitarists
Canadian songwriters
Living people
Canadian alternative rock musicians
Alternative rock guitarists
1970 births
21st-century Canadian guitarists
21st-century Canadian male musicians